Manuel María "Lolo" Escobar Rodríguez (born 13 May 1976) is a Spanish football manager and former player. He is the current manager of Hércules CF.

Career
Born in Don Benito, Badajoz, Extremadura, Escobar moved to Madrid with his parents and joined CD Las Rozas' youth setup at the age of 14. He then went on to feature for the first team before leaving the club at the age of 21.

Escobar began coaching at the age of just 18, being in charge of Las Rozas' Infantil B squad. He subsequently worked in the youth categories of CF Rayo Majadahonda, EF Madrid Oeste Boadilla and FC Villanueva del Pardillo before being named manager of the latter side's first team. He promoted the club from the Segunda de Aficionados (seventh division) to the Preferente (fifth tier) before being sacked in March 2010.

In August 2010, Escobar was named manager of AD Unión Adarve in the fifth division. He helped the club in their promotion to Tercera División in his first season, and reached the play-offs twice in 2013 and 2014, missing out promotion in both.

On 26 June 2014, Escobar took over fellow fourth division side CD Puerta Bonita. He resigned the following January alleging "personal reasons", and was presented as manager of CF Trival Valderas on 29 June 2015.

On 30 June 2016, Escobar was named at the helm of Alcobendas CF, still in division four. He returned to Las Rozas on 8 June of the following year, taking over the main squad in the fifth division and achieving two consecutive promotions.

On 13 May 2020, Escobar announced his departure from Las Rozas after the club kept their Segunda División B status. The following 3 January, after six months without a club, he took over fellow third division side Salamanca CF UDS, severely threatened with relegation.

Escobar managed to avoid relegation with the club, but left on 27 May 2021. On 4 June, he replaced José Alberto at the helm of Segunda División side CD Mirandés.

Escobar's first professional match occurred on 16 August 2021, a 0–0 away draw against Málaga CF. On 13 February of the following year, after a 0–3 home loss against Sporting de Gijón, he was sacked.

On 5 December 2022, Escobar was appointed manager of Segunda Federación side Hércules CF, replacing sacked Ángel Rodríguez.

Managerial statistics

References

External links

1976 births
Living people
People from Don Benito
Sportspeople from the Province of Badajoz
Spanish football managers
Segunda División managers
Segunda División B managers
Tercera División managers
Salamanca CF UDS managers
CD Mirandés managers
Hércules CF managers